The 41st News & Documentary Emmy Awards were presented by the National Academy of Television Arts and Sciences (NATAS), honoring the best in American news and documentary programming in 2019. The winners were announced on two ceremonies via live-stream at Watch.TheEmmys.TV and other apps associated, the winners for the News categories were announced on September 21, 2020, while the ones for the Documentary categories were revealed on September 22, 2020.

The nominees were announced on August 6, 2020 for both the News and the Documentary categories.

Winners and nominees
The nominees were announced on August 6, 2020. Winners in each category are listed first, in boldface.

News programming

Programming in Spanish

Documentary Programming

Craft

Regional News

Multiple nominations

References

External links
 News & Documentary Emmys website

News & Documentary Emmy Awards
Emmy Awards
News & Documentary Emmy Awards